Escape from Scorpion Island is a Bafta nominated BBC children's TV adventure game show in which contestants compete to 'escape from an exotic island'. Series 3 was produced by Foundation/Freehand for CBBC and the Australian Broadcasting Corporation.

Series three premiered on 5 April 2009 on CBBC and on 9 March 2009 on ABC1. The series will often repeat on ABC3 along with Series two.

This series was hosted by JK and Joel. This series was filmed at Mission Beach in far North Queensland (near Tully and Townsville) in 2008. All episodes in this series were one hour long on Sundays at 9:00 am on CBBC. However, in Australia, the episodes were broadcast every weekday and were 30 minutes long.

Synopsis 
Sixteen adventurers arrived at Scorpion Island and were split into three teams: Claw, Sting and Venom. The teams had to win challenges to gain Island Torches for the final challenge.

Contestants 
There were sixteen adventurers on the island, twelve from the UK and four from Australia. The Australian adventurers were Jeremy, Savannah, Tahny and Tyson. The team members are based on those who competed in the final challenges.

Team Claw (Black Helmets) 7 Island Torches
 Eilidh Shearer, 12
 Jemima Hitchings, 13
 Suki Kesington, 12
 Tyson Vacher, 12 
 Oliver Ragen, 12 (Won by Claw in Lethal Lagoon)

Team Sting (Orange Helmets) 6 Island Torches
 Anna Thompson, 13
 Bradlee Wheeler, 12
 Savannah Pingol, 11
 Stevie Willis, 13
 Richard "Ricky" Goulding, 13
 Asad Karim, 12 (Original member of Venom) (Won by Sting in The Boulderizer)

Team Venom (Green Helmets)  1 Island Torch
 Harry Howard, 12
 Jeremy Hartley, 12
 Tahny Hosking, 12
 Imani Hamilton, 11
 Mildred "Millie" Sandz, 12 (Original member of Claw) (Won by Venom in Critical Crossing)

Gaming elements 
 The Eliminator - The teams that lost the previous challenge will take part in this challenge. The winning team from the eliminator gets to face the reigning winners in Double Jeopardy. This element replaces the Limbo Challenge from last series.
 Double Jeopardy - This challenge is between the winners from the last Double Jeopardy and the winners of the last Eliminator. For this challenge, if the winners of the Eliminator wins, not only will they gain an island torch, they also steal the torch from their opposition, become the new reigning winners and bypass the next Eliminator and go straight to the next Double Jeopardy. If the reigning winners win, they gain a new island torch. This element replaces the Ultimate Jeopardy from last series.
 Captain's Challenge - Once the captains from the three teams have been selected, they must go to choosing sticks where they draw out bamboo poles. The captain with the shortest pole gets to take part in a challenge. In the challenge, all members go to a place where the challenge is announced such as playing charades, breaking eggs or revealing cards in a time limit. Should the captain win the challenge, their team wins a luxury reward for themselves. If not, the other two teams share the reward. This element replaces the Survival Challenge and forfeits from last series.
 Island Fire - The Island Fire reveals the name of the next challenge is revealed and selects which members will take part in it for The Eliminator.

List of challenges 
Note: All episodes are based in Australian airing. UK episodes will be based on days.

Day 1 (Episodes 1 and 2)
Lethal Lagoon - On a huge spider web, nine flags are hanging above. Three of them each have their teams colour. The teams together have to race around the spider web getting all of their team flags very quickly and get all team members to the other side of the web. The first to complete it wins.
 Challenge - Anna, Bradlee, Ricky, Savannah and Stevie from Sting vs Eilidh, Jemima, Millie, Suki and Tyson from Claw vs Asad, Harry, Imani Jeremy and Tahny from Venom.
 Prize - Oliver and the first Island Torch.

On the first day at Scorpion Island, all sixteen members have come by helicopter (Imani, Jemima, Ricky, Stevie and Tyson), mini-subs (Anna, Bradlee, Harry, Millie, Oliver and Tahny) and seaplane (Asad, Eilidh, Jeremy, Savannah and Suki) ready to take part in the challenges that the island has waiting. The first task was to find a talisman that is located on the island so they can start the first challenge. Only one of the talismans has a twist. That twist was found by Oliver. Just as he was about to grab it on the beach, he fell and was kidnapped by the island. When everyone else found a talisman, they were told to stand next to a coloured flag that corresponded to the colour of their talisman. The flag represented the teams they were in. Anna, Bradlee, Ricky, Savannah and Stevie got orange talismans so they became Team Sting. Eilidh, Jemima, Millie, Suki and Tyson got black talismans so they became Team Claw. Asad, Harry, Imani, Jeremy and Tahny got green talismans so they became Team Venom.

During the challenge, Team Venom had trouble from the start but Team Claw won the challenge after a great start with Team Sting just coming second. Team Claw won Oliver and an Island Torch.

After the last challenge the members of each team got to choose their camp. Since Claw won the first challenge they got to pick first. The choices of camps were: a sheltered camp with a view of the rapids at the far end of the walkway, the second camp is in between the other two and has more sunlight with more tables and chairs than the first one to hold team meetings with and the third camp is the darkest of the three but it is directly above the lagoon for easy access. All three teams have their own bunks away from the camps and with privacy from one another.

Claw picked the sheltered camp with the view of the rapids. Sting picked the middle camp with the tables and chairs and the sunlight, which left Venom with the third camp directly above the lagoon.

It was then discovered although Claw won Lethal Lagoon at the start they were not working as a team and problems arose between Tyson and Eilidh. Tyson was worried that he was taking over and that would cause problems between the rest of the team and him. Although some good news for Claw that came out of the challenge, Millie had overcome her fear of swamps.

The three teams then had to decide on who would be the first to lead the teams and what the rules of their teams would be. 
Team Sting ended up with these rules:  
 Enjoy yourself
 Work hard and respect your teammates
 Always try your best

Team Claw made these rules: 
Team Claw always cooperates
Team Claw always do their best x10
Team Claw are as strong as their weakest member

Team Venom's Rules:
 Treat people as you would like to be treated
 Teamwork and respect
 Win

Then the teams had to pick their captains for the day. Venom votes first. 
Harry votes for Imani, 
Jeremy votes for Asad,
Asad votes for Harry,
Tahny votes for Harry and 
Imani votes for Harry.
So with three votes Harry becomes Venom's first captain

Sting votes next. 
Savannah votes for Stevie, 
Bradlee votes for Savannah, 
Ricky votes for Savannah, 
Stevie votes for Bradlee and 
Anna votes for Ricky.
So with two votes Savannah becomes Sting's first captain

Claw is next to vote, but they are arguing over the possibility of one person not being happy with the team's choice.
Eilidh votes for Tyson,  
Suki votes for Jemima, 
Tyson votes for Millie, 
Jemima votes for Suki,  
Oliver votes for Jemima and 
Millie votes for Suki. 
The group votes ends in a tie between Suki and Jemima so they have to decide between themselves who will be captain eventually they agree that Jemima should be their first captain

The teams then go to the island fire and learn about the next challenge.

Day 2 (Episodes 3 and 4)
 The Tipping Point - In The Eliminator, there are two long unstable platforms. Each team member had to take turns in transporting island rocks in a bamboo pole across the platforms avoiding the slime and skulls that are in the way. They then have to tip the rocks into a volcano to make it erupt. The first team to do that wins. In Double Jeopardy, there were two players. One on each platform and one of them was blindfolded. The unmasked player had to carefully guide their blindfolded player across the platform to the middle and pass rocks to their bamboo pole. The unmasked player then had to guide the blindfolded one to the end and help them tip the rocks into the volcano and make it erupt. The team that does it the fastest, or is the closet wins.
 The Eliminator - Anna, Bradlee and Stevie from Sting vs Jeremy, Tahny and Asad from Venom.
 Double Jeopardy - Ollie and Tyson from Claw vs Ricky and Savannah from Sting.
 Prize - A new Island Torch if Claw win or a new Island Torch and one from Claw if Sting win.

When The Eliminator started, Stevie and Asad were the first to cross. They were nearly neck and neck and they did not slip, but Asad was the first across. Anna and Tahny were second and Tahny rushed ahead but Anna slipped on the slime and hurt her leg which made her pull out of the challenge. The race was stopped so Bradlee had to take Al's place and cross over the platform twice. Bradlee started to get near Tahny who had just finished her lap. Jeremy was the third to cross for Venom and Bradlee was not far behind him. Just as Jeremy was about to finish, he slipped on the slime and fell off, causing Bradlee to erupt the volcano and win the challenge.

During The Eliminator, Claw, mainly Tyson and Eilidh were arguing on what kind of person would be right for this challenge. Once they finally sorted it out, they chose Oliver and Tyson because they would be just right for it.

Venom went back to their camp and Jeremy was upset because he thought he left his team down. The others cheered him up but he still felt sad.

Sting were the first team to start Double Jeopardy with Ricky being blindfolded and Savannah guiding him. Savannah quickly made her way to the middle of the platforms and carefully guided Ricky across, who was almost about to fall off a lot of times. They took a while to get their bamboo poles lined up because they were so heavy and Savannah fell off but managed not to spill the rocks. They had one try passing but it just was not lined up properly so Savannah had to get some more but the time was up.

When Claw started, Tyson was blindfolded with Ollie guiding him. Ollie went down quickly and Tyson did not fall. Once they had lined up their poles, Ollie tipped the rocks in, but only a small part got in so they had to make do with that. Tyson then went back without dropping the rocks and once he made his shot, the rock had just missed the volcano but because they were closer than Sting, Claw won the challenge.

Island Torch count:

Claw: 2 Torches
Sting: None
Venom: None

Day 3 (Episodes 5 and 6)
 Rock Hard Raise - In The Eliminator, there were some stalls hanging together 20 meters high. Players had to put big soft blocks into all of the stalls very quickly and lock them into place. One player would carry one block at a time, while the other two players would have to pull their player up and down. The team that had all blocks in first, win. In Double Jeopardy, the blocks had letters that spelt out the word "SCORPION" from top to bottom. Some blocks were already in the stalls and had to be rearranged. The first team to complete the word wins.
 The Eliminator - Savannah, Ricky and Al from Sting vs Imani, Harry and Jeremy from Venom.
 Double Jeopardy - Suki, Jemima and Millie from Claw vs Asad, Tahny and Harry from Venom.
 Prize -  A new Island Torch if Claw win or a new Island Torch and one from Claw if Venom win.
 Captain's Challenge - A player had to find 5 hard-boiled eggs with their head in 30 seconds.
 Luxury Prize - Mini Chocolate eggs.

When The Eliminator started, Savannah was taking the blocks up for Sting and Imani was doing it for Venom. Imani got her blocks up quickly while because of Savannah's small size, she could not hold them well and dropped some. Imani also dropped some at some stages causing chances for Sting to catch up. Harry kept falling over and being dragged along by Jeremy. They were nearly neck and neck but because of Savannah's size, Sting lost the challenge and Venom made their way to Double Jeopardy.

Claw was watching the challenge and they said that they needed someone with the right size to carry the blocks while the strongest people should move them up.

Sting went back to camp and Bradlee and Stevie were arguing with the others that they did not tell them about Ricky who had been swapped with Savannah for taking the blocks because Ricky would be too heavy for the girls to pulley up but the others said they did tell them. Because Savannah was the captain, she decided to end the fight by leaving it behind and trying to work together more so everyone apologised and hugged each other.

For Double Jeopardy, Claw chose Harry to play again because of how much he kept falling over in The Eliminator. Suki was carrying the blocks with Millie and Jemima pulling him for Claw and Asad was being pulled up by Tahny and Harry for Venom. Asad quickly changed the letters while Suki was struggling with the locks and the pressure around him. They both dropped blocks and it was hard to tell who was winning at stages. Venom won by three blocks and got one of Claw's Island Torches.

Back at camp, the captains were being selected. Ollie was captain for Claw, Tahny was captain was Venom but there was a hung vote between Bradlee and Stevie in Sting. Stevie said that Bradlee should be captain because she thought he would be very good at it and will be able to make the team work together. Bradlee agreed so he became the captain for Sting.

In the Captain's Challenge, Oliver selected the shortest bamboo stick and had to do the task. Ollie frantically smashed eggs on the sides of his head and thought he found all five but it turned out that the last egg was raw when someone had smashed it. Teams Sting and Venom got the Luxury Prize and shared some of their eggs to Claw.

Day 4 (Episodes 7 and 8)
 Triple Decker - This challenge is similar to Decks of Doom from last series. In The Eliminator, there were two sets of cables. The team members had to slide across on skateboard decks holding a totem pole. If any of the decks fall, they would have to get another one from the start. If they all fell, they would have to get all new decks and start again. The first team to get across and smash their skull on the other end with their totem pole before 10 minutes is up, wins. In Double Jeopardy, one of the players was blindfolded. This time, they had to hold three skulls along. The first team to make it across and put one of their skulls on the end platform wins, or if the time runs out and the first team to drop a deck or a skull, the other team wins.
 The Eliminator - Bradlee and Stevie from Sting vs Eilidh and Tyson from Claw.
 Double Jeopardy - Ricky and Savannah from Sting vs Jeremy and Asad from Venom.
 Prize - A new Island Torch if Venom win, or a new Island Torch and one from Venom if Sting wins.
 Captain's Challenge - There are 10 items on a table and a player has to remember all of them to win.
 Luxury Prize - A barbecue.

When The Eliminator started, Sting were slowly racing ahead with great teamwork while Claw were struggling and wobbling on the cables. Claw fell off a lot of times and even dropped their totem pole but Sting managed to stay on the boards the whole way even after wobbling in the middle. When Sting were almost at the end, Eilidh and Tyson started to use two decks instead of three which made them go a lot faster but it was too late and Sting smashed their skull before Claw. Eilidh cut her leg near the end when her knees were on the cables so she had to go to the medic after the challenge.

Venom were watching and it was up to the boys to work out who was playing Double Jeopardy because Imani and Tahny were ill. Harry did not want to do it because of heights and he did the last challenge twice. Asad also did not want to do it because of how hard he went in the last challenge but was persuaded by the others to do it for the team.

Claw went back to camp without Eilidh because of her leg and thought that they should have had a rhythm going across the cables. They discussed that after getting to know each other, they should think of strategies for these challenges before going ahead and with everyone listening in on their ideas.

For Double Jeopardy, Venom selected Al and Savannah but could not play because her leg that she hurt in The Tipping Point was still hurting so Ricky took her place. Ricky and Asad were the blindfolded players. Venom were having less trouble than Sting, who were struggling but both teams fell off a lot. Sting tried it with two boards but it still did not work. Ricky's blindfold started to fall off so he closed his eyes very tightly so he would not be cheating. Venom started to slow down and Asad and Ricky were nearly crawling on the wires. The time ran out so it was sudden death. Both teams tried to be careful but Venom lost a board making Sting the winners. Jeremy was very upset that he smashed a skull.

The teams went back to camp and selected their new team captain. Venom voted Asad and Sting voted Stevie but there was a hung vote in Claw between Millie, Tyson and Suki. They discussed and agreed to choose Tyson as captain.

The teams then went to the choosing poles and Tyson selected the shortest bamboo stick. The items he had to remember included a skull, axe, lantern, shell, rock, red skull, anchor, chain, rope and more. Tyson studied the items carefully and started to memorise them. He got all of them right but started to forget the last item, which was an axe. He then suddenly remembered it and won the Captain's Challenge for Claw. They got a barbecue with sausages, burgers and onions and they enjoyed it for the rest of the afternoon.

Day 5 (Episodes 9 and 10)
 High Risk High Wire - In The Eliminator, there were three sets of wires each high up. All three members of each team had to crawl across them pushing skulls to the other side. If someone fell, they would be pulled back to the start and would have to start again. The team with all their players across first, wins. In Double Jeopardy, the players had to push a long flag all together. If someone fell, they would be pulled back to the start and the others would have to wait for them to catch up.
 The Eliminator - Millie, Jemima and Suki from Claw vs Imani, Harry and Asad from Venom.
 Double Jeopardy - Stevie, Bradlee and Al from Sting vs Asad, Jeremy and Tahny from Venom.
 Prize - A new Island Torch if Sting win or a new Island Torch and one from Sting if Venom win.
 Captain's Challenge - A player had to smash open a box with a stick, whilst being blindfolded and a bit dizzy.
 Luxury Prize - Sweets for everyone.

In The Eliminator, Millie slowly got across the wire for Claw while everyone else just kept falling because the challenge was very hard. Later, Harry was the first to make it across for Venom without falling, even though he had a fear of heights. Imani found the challenge frustrating and the physical demands were just too much for her so she pulled out. The rules were then changed and the next person who makes it across wins for their team. Millie was waiting at the end for so long that she called her skull Brian. At last, Jemima and Suki started to get close to the end and Asad for catching up for Venom. Suki then fell off, but Jemima could still win it for Claw but Asad made it across and won The Eliminator.

Sting were watching the challenge and discussed about how many challenges each person had done so that they could make it even for this challenge.

Claw went back to camp and discussed that they needed to support each other more and decide to bond with each other.

In Double Jeopardy, no one fell off and Sting were racing ahead with communication and teamwork, but venom were going at different paces. Sting made it to the end and won but Venom were determined to at least finish it but, Asad fell off and they could not continue on.

All the teams went back to camp and voted on their next team captains. Al was the captain for Sting, Suki was the captain for Claw, but Venom had a hung vote between Jeremy and Imani. Jeremy wanted Imani to be captain because the boys have mostly been captain, so Imani became captain.

In the Captain's Challenge, Imani had selected the shortest bamboo pole. Everyone was counting on her as the prize was for everyone. Imani smashed the box and everyone scrambled for the sweets. To take it further, everyone decided to swim in the lagoon for the afternoon and all the teams bonded.

Day 6 (Episodes 11 and 12)
Relentless River Run - In The Eliminator, there were a set of eight unstable hammocks above water. One at a time, each player had to get across all hammocks. to the end and retrieve a team flag. If they fall into the water, the next player goes and they have to go back to the start. The team that has the most players at the end, or the team that was the closest to the end wins. In Double Jeopardy, both teams had to go at the same time. The team that has the most team members at the end wins.
 The Eliminator - Millie, Oliver and Eilidh from Claw vs Harry, Imani and Jeremy from Venom.
 Double Jeopardy - Bradlee, Ricky and Stevie from Sting vs Asad, Tahny and Harry from Venom.
 Prize - A new Island Torch if Sting win or a new Island Torch and one from Sting is Venom win.
 Captain's Challenge - A player has to draw three pictures of people from their rival teams and everyone else has to guess who they are to win.
 Luxury Prize - Art items.

In The Eliminator, Claw went first. Millie rushed ahead to the first hammock and got on it quickly but she fell off on the second one. Oliver was next he also made it to the second hammock. Eilidh was next and she could not reach the first hammock well because of her small size. She got on it but she fell off when trying to get to the second. Millie went again but she fell off on the second hammock again. Ollie then went again and carefully made it to the sixth hammock before the time ran out.

Venom went next and Jeremy made it look easy but he fell off on the second hammock. Imani was next and went up to the sixth hammock and was about to jump to the seventh when time ran out. Both Claw and Venom got one teammate to the sixth hammock, but Venom was faster and won The Eliminator.

Sting was watching and they decided to choose Harry to play because he did not get a go in The Eliminator and thought they had an unfair advantage not seeing him play. They then decided who would play and they all quickly agreed.

Claw went back to camp. Millie said that the reason they were losing challenges was because they were arguing a lot. Eilidh personally felt that everyone else thought that because of her small size and weaker abilities, she would not do well in a challenge. Everyone else cheered her up because they thought Eilidh was determined to keep on going in challenge and of her fighting spirit.

In Double Jeopardy, Bradlee got up to the seventh hammock but fell off when getting to the last hammock. Asad was not a good swimmer and could not swim five meters a few weeks ago, and he did well, but was unable to get up to the first hammock and Tahny took over from him. Ricky was really fast and Tahny was using him as a balance to get across, and they were the first people to get across all the hammocks for both teams. Harry was having trouble getting up the first hammock, and Bradlee raced past him, but fell off on the second hammock. Stevie then went past and Harry got up trying to catch up. There was not much time left so it was up to them. Stevie was really fast and almost fell off in the middle, which was the hardest part. Harry started to slow down, but Stevie made it to the end, and time ran out so Sting were the winners.

Island Torch count:

Sting: 4 Torches
Claw: 1 Torch
Venom: 1 Torch

It was then time to vote for the new captains. Sting voted first: Ricky voted for Bradlee, Bradlee voted for Savannah and Stevie, Savannah and Ala voted for Ricky. So Ricky got three, Savannah and Bradlee got one so Ricky became Sting's captain.

Claw voted next: Jemima and Ollie voted Millie, Eilidh voted Tyson and Suki, Tyson, Millie voted for Ollie. So Ollie got three, Millie got two and Tyson got one so Ollie became Claw's captain.

Venom then voted: Jeremy voted Imani and Harry, Asad, Imani and Tahny voted Jeremy. So Jeremy got four and Imani got one so Jeremy became Venom's captain.

The teams went back to camp for the Captain's Challenge. Ricky chose the shortest bamboo stick and he was playing. In the challenge, he drew a picture of Asad, Eilidh and Harry. Everyone else guessed them correctly and Sting won. They got the Art items which they had fun painting pictures. Savannah wondered if they could share them to the other teams but they thought it was too hard to share. Claw and Venom did not mind them not sharing anyway.

Day 7 (Episodes 13 and 14)
 Depth Charge - In The Eliminator, there were two unfinished rafts, one for each team. The teams had to get all their cogs which were floating in the water and then one person had to get up on the raft to assemble them in their right positions. The first team to finish their raft and move it wins. In Double Jeopardy, the cogs were lying on the seabed and the teams would have to dive down to retrieve them.
 The Eliminator - Millie, Jemima and Tyson from Claw vs Asad, Jeremy and Harry from Venom.
 Double Jeopardy - Bradlee, Al and Savannah from Sting vs Oliver, Eilidh and Suki from Claw.
 Prize - A new Island Torch if Sting win or a new Island Torch and one from Sting if Claw win.
 Captain's Challenge - A player had three chances to guide a metal hoop through a tricky wire course without the hoop touching the wires.
 Luxury Prize - Cameras.

Both Sting and Venom had one player sick. Stevie from Sting had Scorpion Island flu as well as Tahny from Venom. Imani had a mild case of the flu so she still could go to the challenge but not play it.

In The Eliminator, the teams rushed into the water and collected their cogs, but there was a cog that was still lying in the water. Tyson got up on their raft and got all the cogs in correctly for Claw. Asad tried assembling them together, but they did not push them in enough and realised they were the ones who left a cog in the water and Asad swapped places with Harry. Venom started to take their cogs apart thinking they did it wrong. Claw managed to get the cogs in properly and started to screw on the nuts. Venom were still having problems and they had a chance to catch up when Claw had lost their crank to turn the raft. Millie and Jemima desperately dived down to find the crank, when Jemima suddenly found it. Millie got on their raft and managed to work out the crank's position, realising that the disc was to protect fingers and was not a cog. Venom were still having problems but Claw managed to move their raft and they won The Eliminator.

Sting were watching the challenge and they discussed who would play, which cogs they would collect and who would assemble them. They also discussed the other people in Claw's strengths and weaknesses.

Venom went back to camp and they realised they were not feeling complete without Tahny and could not wait for her to come back so they would be a stronger team. They discussed that they were not thinking during the challenge and were just rushing ahead. They said that the next day would be a new start for Venom and they would start winning more challenges.

It was then time for the teams to vote for their new team captains. Sting voted first: Al, Savannah and Ricky voted for Bradlee and Bradlee voted for Savannah. So Savannah had one vote and Bradlee and three votes so Bradlee became Sting's captain.

Claw then voted: Ollie, Tyson, Jemima and Eilidh voted for Millie, Millie voted for Jemima and Suki voted for Eilidh. So Jemima and Eilidh had one vote each and Millie had four votes so Millie became Claw's captain.

Venom then voted: Jeremy and Imani voted for Harry, Asad voted for Imani and Harry voted for Asad. So Imani and Asad had one vote each and Harry had two votes so Harry became Venom's captain.

In Double Jeopardy, Sting and Claw rushed out and managed to get all their cogs. Claw got up to their raft and Sting came shortly. Ollie got on the raft for Claw and Bradlee got on Sting's. It was almost neck and neck with them trying to get their cogs on. Suki and Eilidh from Claw had to undo their raft's anchor and they went looking around not realising it had to be taken off on their raft which drove Millie, Jemima and Tyson shouting to them from the beach. Sting and Claw had almost got their raft ready at the same time and they tried to turn them, but Sting suddenly could not move it and Claw's cog's teeth were not meshing together properly. Claw quickly got their cogs together and they won the challenge.

In the Captain's Challenge, Millie chose the shortest bamboo stick. She carefully guided the metal hoop but got a buzz when it touched a hard part. On the second go, she managed to get past the part she touched last time and everyone else was trying to be quiet, with Suki making the table rock. Millie luckily got the hoop through the whole course and won the challenge. They got their cameras which had 27 photos each to take. They took photos of each other, the lagoon near them and their camp.

Day 8 (Episodes 15 and 16)
 Collision Course - This challenge is similar to The Last Gasp from Series 2. In The Eliminator, there were two sets of barrels in Thunder River. Two team members had to swim underneath these into small spaces. They had to open the doors on the platforms to haul a long rope with two skulls on it. Once the rope had been freed, they both had to swim back to the start and put the skulls in a holder. The fastest team wins. In Double Jeopardy, one team member was blindfolded and the other had to guide them through the course. They had to pull a piece of rope with skulls on it. In each door, that had to put a skull through. Once all the skulls have been placed, the team races down to a treasure chest to release coloured balls. The fastest team wins.
 The Eliminator - Bradlee and Ricky from Sting vs Jeremy and Tahny from Venom.
 Double Jeopardy - Jemima and Oliver from Claw vs Harry and Asad from Venom.
 Prize - A new Island Torch if Claw win or a new Island Torch and one from Claw if Venom win.
 Captain's Challenge - A player had to match all pairs of playing cards on a board turing two cards at a time.
 Luxury Prize - Swimming gear.

In The Eliminator, Sting worked well together in the first set of barrels, when they started to nearly have trouble with the long rope on the second. They got their skulls and Bradlee tried throwing his skull to get across. When Venom went, Tahny managed to do the first set of barrels all by herself. Jeremy then got used to it and he managed to help Tahny with the rope. Venom won by 45 seconds.

During the challenge, Claw were watching and decided to pick Jemima and Oliver. But Suki was sad that he did not get chosen because he said that he was a good swimmer. The team told him how they think he would be good for other challenges. Millie apologised to Suki that he was not chosen but said that they will choose him in other challenges they think he would be good at. Suki was happy and they hugged.

Sting went back to their camp and thought that they did very well, and that they will continue to work together. Sting said that they will get their way back into winning challenges.

In Double Jeopardy, Claw went first with Ollie being blindfolded.  Jemima pulled their rope of skulls underneath the barrels because they were hard to carry. They quickly went through to the second set of barrels, and Ollie went through and opened the doors by himself without Jemima. Jemima quickly got the other skulls out and she dived down to open up the treasure chest on her first go. Venom went next. Asad and Harry were not good at swimming and the blindfolded Asad managed to get to the barrels before Harry. Asad started to get worried about going under but Harry helped him get through. Harry started to lose some skulls off his rope. Once he got them, he went back to Asad. Harry tried to get to the first barrel, but he found it hard to get the skulls underwater. Once he finally pulled them under and got a skull through the first door, Asad started getting freezing and had a cramp. The cramp was getting so serious that he could not continue the challenge. Claw won the challenge.

The teams went back to camp to vote on their team captains. Savannah was Sting's captain, Eilidh was Claw's captain and Asad was Venom's captain.

In the Captain's Challenge, Eilidh selected the shortest bamboo stick. She tried to get all the matches, but the time ran out when she only had four matches to go. Sting and Venom got the swimming gear and they played and relaxed in the lagoon in the afternoon.

At the Island Fire, when the players left, J.K and Joel told the viewers that something was going to happen to Claw, and they were not going to like it.

Day 9 (Episodes 17 and 18)
 Critical Crossing - In The Eliminator, there were 5 swings high up above the rapids of Thunder River. One team member had to get across to the end and jump off to catch a skull, while the other team member moved the skull so they could reach it. The team that makes it the quickest or is the closest wins. In Double Jeopardy, both team members would have to get across to retrieve and wave two flags in under four minutes. The fastest team wins.
 The Eliminator - Al and Savannah from Sting vs Imani and Tahny from Venom.
 Double Jeopardy - Suki and Tyson from Claw vs Harry and Jeremy from Venom.
 Prize - Millie for the winner of The Eliminator and a new Island Torch if Claw win or a new Island Torch and one from Claw if Venom win.
 Captain's Challenge -  A player had to find a gold skull in a barrel of gloop.
 Luxury Prize - Chocolate fondue.

For the past few days, Team Claw have been working well as a team and have been winning the recent challenges. But the Island became restless and decided to shock them. When Millie woke up, she found a message in a skull on the ground telling her to go to the picking sticks. She went up and selected one of the bamboo poles. She snapped it open and got a message. The message read, "You are mine.". She screamed and was captured in the Island's clutches. Millie was going to be the prize for whoever won The Eliminator.

Before The Eliminator started, Joel told the players that there was an extra player who was going to be won. The girls were surprised and wondered who it was. The challenge started and Sting went first with Savannah going on the swings. She kept falling off and was very slow, but she got to the last swing to get the skull. She tried to get it, but the time ran out. Venom went next with Tahny going on the swings. Tahny got her balance and did not fall off. She got to the last swing but also could not get it. So both teams got to the last swing, but Venom was the fastest and they won. The covered cage was revealed and Millie came out. She was very happy to be out of the Island's clutches and glad to be in a new team. Claw were watching and were devastated. Tyson tried to put on a brave face but the rest of Claw were unhappy.

Sting went back to camp. They thought they did well but the disadvantages they had made them lose. Stevie started to wonder if she was in the wrong team because she had no one in her team she really liked except maybe Bradlee like the other players thought and she was good friends with Millie and a little unhappy that they did not win her.  Savannah was sad because in every Eliminator she had been in, she would lose it and they would have fights revolving around her.

In Double Jeopardy, Claw went first. They were determined to win after losing Millie and had their own rhythm for the swings. They went across the first swing quickly but Tyson and Suki's steps caused each other to fall off. On the second swing when Suki was making it across, he fell off and went straight to the third swing instead of the second, which gave them a 10-second time penalty. They got to their flags and were taking a while to undo their flags because of their tired hands. They got the flags and finished before the four minutes was up. Venom had to get across before Claw's time ticked back to zero or Claw will win. Jeremy and Harry were taking too long on the first two swings, and Harry even had to go back to untangle his harness. Jeremy jumped to the third swing but fell off. He went straight the third swing instead of going back to the second which also gave Venom a 10-second time penalty. They both were on the third swing but their time ran out and Claw was the winner.

Island Torch count:

Claw: 5 Torches
Sting: 3 Torches
Venom: 1 Torch

It was then time for the teams to vote for their captains. Suki was Claw's captain, Tahny was Venom's but Sting had a hung vote between Stevie and Ricky. Ricky told her that he had voted for Al but wanted to give it to Stevie because he thought she would be a very good captain so Stevie became Sting's captain.

In the Captain's Challenge, Tahny chose the shortest bamboo stick and had to do the challenge. She managed to get nearly all the gloop out of the barrel and found the skull in the pile she'd taken out. They won chocolate fondue and decided to share it with the other teams. But then everyone started to mess around and smeared chocolate on their faces.

Day 10 (Episodes 19 and 20)
Wheelspin - This challenge is the similar to Reckless Rally from Series 2. In The Eliminator, two players would be driving a Scorpion Island buggy around a dirt terrain course marking out the sting of a scorpion without crashing into poles breaking skulls on the side of their buggy and the course getting a 10-second time penalty. Once they were done, they had to drive into a hay bale to finish. In Double Jeopardy, one player had to drive blindfolded while the other helped them.
 The Eliminator - Ricky and Bradlee from Sting vs Imani and Asad from Venom.
 Double Jeopardy - Al and Savannah from Sting vs Suki and Eilidh from Claw.
 Prize - A new Island Torch if Claw win or a new Island Torch and one from Claw if Sting win.
 Captain's Challenge - Have fun and chill out!

In The Eliminator, Venom went first with Asad driving. He went around very fast but crashed one of their skulls. Imani was screaming but trying to help him. They then got stuck in the hardest part of the course and smashed a skull but they made it to the finish line. Sting then went with Bradlee driving, because he has go-kart skills. They slowly but carefully got across the course without smashing a skull and won The Eliminator.

Claw were watching and at first decided Jemima and Eilidh to play the challenge. Eilidh was happy that the team was not arguing anymore. But then Jemima started to feel unconfident and felt like she was going to lose the challenge. They thought Oliver should play it, but finally decided Suki and Eilidh to do it. Tyson was annoyed that no one told him about this and he said that the teams should make the decisions together. He was still happy about who had been chosen.

Venom went back to camp and they thought that Asad and Imani were having more fun instead of doing the challenge. Imani said that he was actually helping him. Harry then said that Tahny was not being a captain properly. She said that she did not like to be bossy to others and she said that because she was the captain, did not mean that she could do what she wanted to.

In Double Jeopardy, Claw went first with Suki being blindfolded. It was hard work and Eilidh almost muddled up her left's and right's with Suki. They ended up driving into the edge of the course and smashed a skull. They then missed one of the posts, which gave them another time penalty. They got all the way to the end in four minutes. It was then Sting's turn and they had to get through the course before Claw's time ticked down to zero. As soon as they started, the blindfolded Al crashed into a post straight away. Savannah carefully tried to help her but they were stuck at the start of the course, which made the other supporters from Sting, shouting to her what to do. Even Claw, tried to make her crash and Stevie said some harsh words to Tyson who mixed up his left and right's. Sting smashed two skulls and one of the skulls on the edge of the course. They got stuck between two of the poles, and Al nearly broke the engine. The time ran out and Claw won, and it was not even close.

It was then time the teams to vote for their new captains. Tyson became Claw's captain, Ricky became Sting's captain and Imani became Venom's captain.

In the Captain's Challenge, all captain's got the same sized bamboo pole. They broke open their poles which all together spelt a message, "Your challenge is to have fun and chill out.". The Island was being unusually nice, and all teams played in the lagoon near their camps through the rest of the afternoon.

At the Island Fire, after the adventures left, J.K and Joel said that the Island Torches were very important, and that the teams have no idea how important they are.

Day 11 (Episodes 21 and 22)
 Unbearable Load - In The Eliminator, two team members were holding up a heavy barrel while the opposing team member was trying to make it heavier by throwing skulls into it. The first team that makes their barrel fall into the water loses. In Double Jeopardy, instead of having two team members haul up a barrel, a member of the opposition needed to be hauled instead and they would catch the throwers' skulls and put them in a sack.
 The Eliminator - Stevie, Anna and Ricky from Sting vs Harry, Jeremy and Millie from Venom.
 Double Jeopardy - Stevie, Bradlee, Al and Savannah from Sting vs Jemima, Oliver, Tyson and Suki from Claw.
 Prize - A new Island Torch if Claw win or a new Island Torch and one from Claw if Sting win.
 Captain's Challenge - A player had to identify five people from their rival teams blindfolded by touching them.
 Luxury Prize - Ice-cream.

In the Eliminator, Ricky and Millie raced towards the platform and they pushed each other trying to get up. Ricky managed to get a number of skulls in Venom's bucket, but Millie, who is a netball player, kept missing Sting's barrel. Venom were really struggling holding their barrel up, but Sting kept saying that it was easy. Once the bags of skulls were empty, Ricky and Millie swam trying to collect the skulls floating in the water. Once, Millie got on the platform again, she got two perfect throws into Sting's barrel. Jeremy and Harry were close to dropping their barrel, but they confidently pulled their barrel higher than Sting's. Ricky and Millie were both stealing each other's skulls and Jeremy even had to use his teeth to pull, while he was resting his hand. In the end, because of the heavy weight of skulls, Venom dropped their barrel in the water and Sting won The Eliminator.

Millie had hurt her leg a little when she got pushed by Ricky, so she went to the medic, while the other players in Venom went back to camp. They discussed that they needed to have a proper team talk before each challenge, and to have better tactics.

After being on Scorpion Island for a while, the adventures reflected on their time so far. Some said that they loved doing things they could not do in regular life and had fun making great friends. Others started talking about how they would use things they learned when they went home.

Before Double Jeopardy, Claw chose everyone out of their team to play except for Eilidh, but they said that they would choose her for the next challenge. They chose everyone from Sting to play except for Ricky, because they thought he did very well in The Eliminator. In Double Jeopardy, Jemima and Anna were throwing skulls to Suki and Stevie. Jemima wetted her skulls before throwing them so they could be heavier. Suki started to fall off his seat but he caught one before splashing down into the water, causing the game to restart. Once the game restarted, both teams caught most of their skulls, and were working well but Oliver from Claw kept feeling like Tyson had let go of the rope. Bradlee and Savannah were struggling trying to hold theirs because Claw had more skulls than Sting, but Claw were losing. Just as the teams were still trying to hold their rivals, Claw tried really hard but they made Stevie go into the water and Sting had won, just as Savannah and Bradlee were about to drop theirs. Ollie argued with Tyson thinking he had let go of the rope, but it turns out he did not.

Island Torch count:

Sting: 5 Torches
Claw: 5 Torches
Venom: 1 Torch

It was then time for the teams to vote for their new team captain. Al became Sting's captain, Jemima became Claw's captain and Asad became Venom's captain.

In the Captain's Challenge, Asad selected the shortest bamboo pole. He had to identify Ollie, Eilidh, Suki, Savannah and Bradlee. Some of them were trying to make funny faces but Asad got them all correct and Venom won. They got the ice creams and were thinking about giving one to Ollie, but they thought that everyone else would want one so they decided not to share. Tyson, Stevie and Bradlee joked around that they would have preferred having brains instead. Claw forgot about not having the ice creams, by jokingly re-enacting the task.

Day 12 (Episodes 23 and 24)
 Serious Scramble - This challenge is similar to Serious Scramble from the last series. In The Eliminator, the teams had to swim to Skeleton Falls, climb up the waterfall and then climb up on a high net. Once they reached the top, they had to open a bag to release coloured balls. The first team to go up to the top and release the balls wins. In Double Jeopardy, the teams had to go through the course until they get to the scramble net. There were several ropes making an outline of a scorpion. The teams had to put together the five un-joined ropes. The team that completes the scorpion the fastest wins.
 The Eliminator - Eilidh and Suki from Claw vs Tahny and Imani from Venom.
 Double Jeopardy - Bradlee and Stevie from Sting vs Asad and Harry from Venom.
 Prize - A new Island Torch if Sting win or a new Island Torch and one from Sting if Venom win.
 Captain's Challenge - A player had to taste five dishes blindfolded and had to guess which dish was chicken. Other dishes were crocodile, emu, kangaroo and venison (referred to as rat).
 Luxury Prize - Water Guns.

In The Eliminator, both teams were nearly neck and neck, but Tahny made it into the lead for Venom. They both found it hard to get up the waterfall, but both got up still nearly tied. Once they got to the net, Eilidh's small size made her slower to get up and Imani started having bad asthma. Tahny motivated her to keep going and both Suki and Tahny got up to the top first. Eilidh was still slowly getting up but Imani got up to the top, released the coloured balls and Venom won.

Sting were watching and decided who should play Double Jeopardy. They decided Bradlee and Stevie to play, but Ricky was not happy with that because other times, Sting have chosen for everyone to do an equal number of challenges. Ricky wanted to do it with Stevie, but she said that when they play, they always get into arguments. The team had a vote, but it was still decided for Bradlee and Stevie to play because they worked strongly together. Ricky started to get upset of this. Stevie said that because it was getting closer to the final challenge, they should change their strategy a little. Ricky was still disappointed, but thought that Bradlee and Stevie would do well together.

Claw went back to camp and discussed that they needed to push themselves towards the limit. They were disappointed that they lost but hoped Venom would win so they would have the highest number of Island Torches.

In Double Jeopardy, Venom went first. Asad and Harry got up to the net quickly and got the first three ropes in but they took a while finding the last two and had to listen to their team member's shouts. Sting went next and got their ropes in quickly, but Stevie had trouble with one of them and nearly fell off. Sting won by only a few seconds.

The teams went back to camp and voted for their new team captains. Eilidh was Claw's captain, Millie was Venom's captain and Stevie was Sting's captain.

In the Captain's Challenge, Stevie selected the shortest bamboo pole. Everyone screamed and squealed when they realised the names of the first four dishes. Stevie liked them except for the emu. When she ate the last dish which was chicken, all the teams pretended that she was eating something horrible. She thought that the chicken was either the first dish or last dish, guessed last and won the challenge. They got the water guns and had fun with them around the camp. Some of Venom's team members would have loved to have a water gun and Claw started to plan an attack on Sting if they wet them. Tyson ran up to Sting and stole one of their guns and they started spraying Claw's camp, then Venom threw buckets of water at them.

Day 13 (Episodes 25 and 26)
 Don't Look Down - In the Eliminator, on The Shattered Skull, a mysterious pirate ship, the players had to climb up the ship up to the top, walk across on wires holding hands together pushing skulls with their feet until the time runs out. If they fell off, they had to start again. The team that makes it to the end the fastest, or makes the furthest wins. In Double Jeopardy, the players had to hang five skulls on hooks. Once a skull was put on, they had to go back and put another one on. The team that gets all their skulls on the fastest or puts the most skulls up until the time runs out wins.
 The Eliminator  - Tyson and Ollie from Claw vs Jeremy and Asad from Venom.
 Double Jeopardy - Bradlee and Ricky from Sting vs Imani and Harry from Venom.
 Prize  - A new Island Torch if Sting win or a new Island Torch and one from Sting if Venom win.
 Captain's Challenge - A player had to spell seven words from a ten-word list correctly.
 Luxury Prize - Face Paints.

In The Eliminator, Claw went first. Ollie was mainly taking charge because Tyson was nervous. They slowly but carefully moved along the wires before Ollie ended up causing them falling. They went again and started to go further, but again Ollie caused them to fall. They were working hard but both seemed to be enjoying it. They went again and got around the middle of the wires before their time ran up. Claw's skulls stayed in the placed they finished so Venom knew how far they had to go to win. Venom went second and Asad and Jeremy were close to falling at some stages, but they kept their balance. They got up to Claw's skulls and pushed them along with their skulls, but they fell off. Venom were cheering from the ship anyway because they knew they won.

During the challenge, Sting were watching with the captain Stevie on The Shattered Skull to take a close look, while the others were on a boat nearby. The rest of Sting thought that Bradlee, Ricky and Savannah would be right for the challenge and were sure that Stevie was going to make the right decision. She chose Bradlee because he is a strong player and Ricky because he had missed out on recent challenges. Stevie also chose Harry and Imani to play for Venom, because she thought that Millie and Tahny would be better at this challenge than them.

Claw went back to camp. They thought Tyson and Ollie did the best they could, but thought that they lost because of their small size. They discussed that they needed to win the next challenge to be in the lead with Island Torches. They also discussed that they needed to have less fun now because it was getting close to the end of their stay, and they needed to start focusing more on escaping Scorpion Island rather than anything else. They also said that they needed to stick to their team constitution.

In Double Jeopardy, Sting went first. Ricky and Bradlee were slowly working together and they carefully put each skull in place, with not many falls and they finished with 8 seconds left. Venom went next and they were only getting used to the heights. They had problems getting the skulls on while holding each other and fell off a lot of times. The time ran out and Venom only had two skulls hung, so Sting won the challenge.

Island Torch count:

Sting: 7 Torches
Claw: 5 Torches
Venom: 1 Torch

Sting and Venom headed back to Scorpion Island and it was time for the Captain's Challenge. Millie selected the shortest bamboo pole so she was playing. She managed to easily spell most of the words like camp, island and more as they go harder. Millie then had to spell strategy but got it wrong. She got the next word correct and Venom won. They got the face paints and they each painted themselves with different patterns. Ollie went up to them and asked if they could have some, but they said no. Ollie and some others then started spraying them with water guns.

Day 14 (Episodes 27 and 28)
 Daredevil Drop - In The Eliminator, there was a hot air balloon hanging on two sets of cables. The teams had one player to use a hand bike to get to the balloon and throw sandbags into their side of the basket while the other player passes the bags to them. The team that has the most sandbags in their side of the balloon and makes it fall to the ground wins. In Double Jeopardy, one player had to carry a skull across to the other side and throw it to the other player. The other player had to catch the skull and petal back to put it on their platform. The team with the most skulls transported wins.
 The Eliminator - Jemima and Eilidh from Claw vs Millie and Tahny from Venom.
 Double Jeopardy - Stevie and Savannah from Sting vs Tyson and Suki from Claw.
 Prize - A new Island Torch if Sting win or a new Island Torch and one from Sting if Claw win.
 Captain's Challenge - A player has to make five things out of modelling clay and everyone else has to guess three of them.
 Luxury Prize - An afternoon off for everyone.

In The Eliminator, Millie was pedaling for Venom and Jemima was pedaling for Claw. Jemima got up to the balloon first, she threw her sandbag and got it in for Claw. Millie then got up but missed it. Jemima collected another sandbag and tried to throw it, but the rope stopped the bag getting in. Millie tried again but still missed it. She started to struggle and could not feel she could do it. Jemima threw her next sandbag, and it was close to going into the basket but fell out, almost going into Venom's side. Millie still had trouble and she threw a sandbag from a too far distance. She rested her arms by hand biking back one handed. On Jemima's fifth attempt, she carefully lined her throw up and got the sandbag in, which was enough for the balloon to crash down to the ground.

During The Eliminator, Sting were watching and decided to choose Stevie and Savannah, because they thought they would be right for this challenge and Savannah had not played a challenge for a while. They chose Tyson and Suki to play Double Jeopardy for Claw because they thought Ollie would do well in this challenge.

Venom went back to camp, and they had no more chances of winning Island Torches. They had 1 Torch. Harry said that they needed to start being serious for the final challenge, but Tahny said that Jeremy, Asad and Harry were mucking around all the time. Harry and Asad tried to defend themselves saying that they can have a laugh but they said they were serious in the challenges. Tahny and everyone else was unhappy that they were losing challenges but the boys said that they were not always mucking around. Imani said that she would rather not escape the island all proud of each other instead of escaping hating each other. The boys said that they were not going to muck around anymore even though Tahny did not think so, but they all agreed they were going to put 110% into the final challenge.

In Double Jeopardy, Sting went first with Stevie throwing the skulls to Savannah. Savannah made the mistake to let go of the hand bike, and she went backwards down the slope hitting herself. She went back up and Stevie threw the skull to her, but she missed. Stevie went back to get another but Savannah made the mistake of going back to the start when she could have just stayed there, and she had to rely on her teammates watching. Stevie then threw the skull to Savannah, and she almost grabbed it but dropped it. Stevie got another skull and threw again, and this time Savannah caught it. She then pedaled back to the start, but the skull slipped between her legs and fell off while she was half way. Stevie went back to the start but decided to stop the challenge because she was very tired and a little annoyed at Savannah. Claw went next with Suki throwing the skulls to Tyson. As they were pedaling, Suki dropped his skull and had to get another. Tyson made the same mistake as Savannah by going back to the start when he could have stayed there. They were about to throw but it was too far, so they went closer. Suki threw the skull to Tyson and he touched it, but accidentally batted it away. Suki went back to get another. He threw it and Tyson caught it. He then started to peddle back slowly and he put the skull on his platform which was all they needed to do to win the challenge. Claw got a torch from Sting and a new one so they were on seven Island Torches and Sting went back to six.

The teams went back to their camp's to vote for their new team captain for the final challenge. Ollie became Claw's captain and Asad became the captain for Venom, but there was a hung vote between Savannah and Ricky for Sting. Ricky gave it to Savannah so she became Sting's captain.

In the final Captain's Challenge, Oliver selected the shortest bamboo pole. Once again, the prize is for everyone. He molded a skull, which everyone got it right. He then molded a spider, which many assume it to be a scorpion but eventually got it right. Then he molded a hutch which despite struggling to look like it and the rest of the adventurers having trouble making out on it, they got it right. The prize is an afternoon off from the pressures of Scorpion Island so the adventurers all decide to have fun in the lagoon for the rest of the afternoon.

The teams then went to the Island Fire for the last time. JK and Joel told them that the last day was going to be in two stages. First, an Eliminator and then a final challenge. The team that lost The Eliminator would go into lockdown and not escape. They revealed that the Island Torches had two advantages. The first was that the team with the most torches would bypass The Eliminator and go on to the final challenge, which was Team Claw. The second advantage was not going to be revealed until the final challenge. Sting and Venom were going to play The Eliminator so Sting placed their hands on the Island Palms to see who was playing. The flame faded under none of them so they were all playing. It was then Venom's turn to place their hands on the Island Palms. The Island chose everyone except Asad. Because they had the fewest Island Torches and six players,  team captain Asad was being taken out of Team Venom and offered up as a prize for whoever won The Eliminator. Everyone in Venom was very upset and shocked about it, especially Imani. The teams went back to camp except Asad who was being taken by the Island. JK and Joel said to the viewers that Asad had a special advantage.

Day 15 (Episodes 29 and 30)
 The Boulderizer - This challenge is similar to The Crush Rush from last series. The players had to go one from each team at a time through a course picking up team flags while being chased by a huge boulder. They had to swing on a rope, crawl under a net and run through a muddy pond. If one player gets hit by the boulder the other team wins that part or, the first person to the finish line wins that round for their team. The team that has the most wins from each round wins.
 The Escape - The teams had to abseil face first down Skeleton Falls two at a time, some of them were blindfolded depending on how many torches each team had. After going down the waterfall, the teams had to swim all the way through Thunder River under a series of rocky platforms to the end of the river. The first team to get all their players through the course, escapes the island.
 The Eliminator - Stevie, Bradlee, Savannah, Ricky and Al from Sting vs Jeremy, Tahny, Harry, Millie and Imani from Venom.
 Prize - Asad and a place in The Escape against Team Claw.
 Final Challenge - Ricky, Al, Savannah, Stevie, Bradlee and Asad from Sting vs Jemima, Tyson, Eilidh, Suki and Oliver from Claw.
 Prize - Escape From Scorpion Island.

Asad had spent the night in a cage while Venom were still trying to get over the news from last night. Jeremy and Harry did extra training last night and everyone cheered Imani up after she was upset. Stevie from Sting felt sorry for Venom and thought it was cruel of the island but they really wanted to get onto the final challenge and win Asad.

Before The Eliminator started, Sting and Venom had team talks. Sting thought that the net in the course was going to be hard to go through, so they said they had to get down as low as possible. They also planned to carry the flags by their teeth. Venom however, seemed negative because Millie was worried that she was going to get her clothes wet. The rest of the team said they needed to focus on winning Asad and had to run as fast as possible.

The first race was Anna vs Millie. They both struggled in the net but the boulder hit Anna so Millie won for Venom. The next race was Savannah vs Harry. They were neck and neck in the net but Savannah won for Sting, but she said well done to Harry. The third race was Bradlee vs Jeremy. Jeremy fell over and did a superhero move to get back up. They both switched sides twice and the boulder hit Jeremy in the net so Sting won. If Jeremy had not swapped sides, then the boulder would have hit Bradlee. The fourth race was Ricky vs Tahny. Tahny had dropped a flag but quickly got ahead of Ricky, and the boulder hit Ricky in the net, but Tahny even though she won left nothing to chance and ran through the rest of the course. The last race was the decider with Stevie vs Imani. Stevie missed a flag and dropped another but she did not go back because she was close to the boulder. They went through the net but the boulder hit Imani. But Stevie did the same thing as Tahny even though she had won and ran through the rest of the course. Imani was still underneath the boulder, sobbing to herself saying she let her team down.

Before they found out the result, the girls in Sting and Venom were holding hands with each other because they were all close to each other throughout the whole series. Sting had won against Venom by one race. There were many tears and hugs by both teams as Venom were not going to escape. Venom and Asad said that he was still a part of their team. Asad was released from the Island and went over to Sting, his new team and Venom were in lockdown so they went into the cage. Sting made their way to the final challenge and Venom shouted to do it for their team with both teams making the name Stenom.

After hearing about The Escape, JK revealed the second advantage of the Island Torches. The advantage was that they gave the power of light, so the torches were exchanged for blindfolds and the more torches each team had, the more number of unblindfolded players there would be. As Claw had seven torches, they would have three unblindfolded players. Sting had six, so they had two unblindfolded players but after Sting won Asad, he had an advantage. The advantage was that Asad would not be blindfolded. If Sting did not win Asad, then one of the unblindfolded players would have to go all the way back up the course to get the last blindfolded player. Stevie for Sting chose Savannah and Anna to be unblindfolded, as well as Asad despite the fact he will be unblindfolded anyway because of his advantage which means she, Ricky and Bradlee will be blindfolded while Oliver for Claw chose himself, Jemima and Suki to be unblindfolded which means Tyson and Eilidh will be blindfolded.

In the final challenge, Oliver and blindfolded Tyson started for Claw and Savannah and blindfolded Stevie started for Sting. Sting were leading but Savannah was not helping Stevie much. Claw were going too slowly and Tyson was not leaning forward enough. Savannah and Stevie finally made their way down and Anna and blindfolded Ricky started going down. They slowly were still leading and were working well and Tyson and Oliver had gone down so Jemima and blindfolded Eilidh went down. Jemima kept telling Eilidh to lean forward and found it hard to work with her. Anna and Ricky made their way down so Asad and blindfolded Bradlee were going down. They weren't communicating enough and were struggling. Stevie and Savannah were still leading for Sting and were getting close to the rocky platforms unaware of how the others were going. Once Eilidh and Jemima slowly made their way down the waterfall, Suki, who was by himself, charged down the waterfall like a mad man. He got ahead of Asad and Bradlee and Claw were in the lead. Asad and Bradlee got down the waterfall and started swimming, which Asad was not confident of. Stevie and Savannah went through the rocky platforms and were the first to make it through the course. Tyson and Oliver soon followed and became the first for Claw. Soon, Anna and Ricky got through and only had to wait for Bradlee and Asad for Sting to win. Jemima and Eilidh soon followed and the teams were anxiously waiting for their remaining team members to come through. Suki, Asad and Bradlee made it to the rocky platforms close to each other. The next person came up from the water who was Suki and Claw had escaped from Scorpion Island. Bradlee and Asad could only watch and they tried to finish their great effort, but Bradlee went ahead and Asad could not go on further. Asad felt disappointed in himself because of his swimming and everyone else in Sting was sad, but they were proud at each other's work.

The winners, Claw ran to JK. They pushed a plunger which set off an explosion, and two helicopters came to pick them up. On the way, the helicopters stopped off at a place nearby for the adventurers to call their parents. There were many tears as they'd all been away from their family for so long and missed them very much.

Statistics

This table shows how many Island Torches each team had at the end of each day.

This table shows how many times Sting, Claw and Venom faced off against each other, excluding the challenges on Days 1 and 15.

Wins and Losses

The first table excludes the challenges on Day 1 and Day 15.

Legend:

1st- This team won the challenge on Day 1.

2nd- This team came second in the challenge on Day 1.

3rd- This team came third in the challenge on Day 1.

WIN- This team bypassed The Eliminator and won Double Jeopardy, and therefore winning an Island Torch.

win- This team won both The Eliminator and Double Jeopardy, and therefore winning an Island Torch and taking one from the losing team.

LOST- This team bypassed The Eliminator, but lost Double Jeopardy, and therefore had to give an Island Torch to the winning team.

lost- This team won The Eliminator, but lost Double Jeopardy.

OUT- This team lost The Eliminator.

SKIP- This team got to skip The Final Eliminator.

THRU- This team won The Final Eliminator, and therefore got to compete in The Escape.

GONE- This team lost The Final Eliminator, and therefore went into lockdown and could not compete in The Escape.

WINNERS- This team won The Escape, and therefore escaped Scorpion Island this season.

RUNNER-UPS- This team lost The Escape, and therefore came second this season.

XXXXXXXXXXXX- This team did not compete in The Escape, and therefore came third this season.

Facts
 Each team has had six members at one stage. Sting never lost a member. Both Sting and Venom had three chances to win members; Oliver, Millie and Asad. Claw, having bypassed The Eliminator in the last two cases, only got one chance and succeeded.
 All team members have been captain at some stage. Millie was team captain for both Claw and Venom, the only person to lead two teams, and Oliver was never actually a member of a team before Claw, and Asad joined Sting after the last vote.
 Asad had been captain four times, more than anyone else.
 Jeremy had only been captain once. 
 Oliver is the only adventurer to have arrived on the island via mini sub to have escaped.
 Harry has been picked for Double Jeopardy by the opposite team the most times with six. 
 Asad and Ricky have been blindfolded the most times with three each. 
 Harry, Jemima, Jeremy, Millie, Savannah and Tahny have never been blindfolded. 
 Bradlee has played in the most challenges with 13. 
 Oliver has played in the least challenges with only seven.
 The cages seen in Lethal Lagoon, Critical Crossing and The Boulderizer are the same cages used for the Limbo captives in Series 2.
 In one occurrence of Ricky being captain, his name was spelt "Ricki". He said so himself that that was a typo.
 In the fourth series applications for contestants of the show, Tyson (Series 3) was mentioned as applicants favourite player overall more times than anyone, with Oliver being mentioned as second favourite.
 Claw is the only team to have lost a Captain's Challenge.
 Sting and Venom never lost a Captain's Challenge.
 Claw have competed in the most Captain's Challenges with five while Sting competed in the least Captain's Challenges with only two.
 Venom has won the most Captain's Challenges with four while they also won the most luxuries being seven with two that were won by default and two that were won for all teams. 
 Millie and Oliver are the only adventurers to have competed in a Captain's Challenge more than once. However, Oliver lost the first one and won the second one while Millie won both times. 
 Not counting those won by default or for everybody, Sting are the only team to have never received a food based luxury in the Captain's Challenges.  
 Eilidh is the only adventurer to have never won a Captain's Challenge. 
 Al, Bradlee, Harry, Jemima, Jeremy, Savannah and Suki never competed in a Captain's Challenge.  
 For reasons unknown not counting Day 10 as the Island decided the adventurers should have fun and Day 15 due to the escape, there was no Captain's Challenge held on Day 1 or 2. 
 This marks the only time that a team with more males than females have escaped. 
 Triple Decker, Collision Course, Wheelspin and The Boulderizer were the only challenges that were also seen in Series 2. The Double Jeopardy for Serious Scramble was, however, fairly similar to Series 1's Rock 'n' Roll.
 A challenge similar to High Risk High Wire was also played in the next series to determine the Balance Representatives. 
 In many scenes, especially the first few episodes, spoilers were shown such as Millie wearing a green Venom helmet, future challenges and clues showing which team won a challenge. Also, there was a clip of Imani crying with a boulder on top of her saying that she just let her team down, possibly meaning that Venom lost the Boulderizer.
 Tyson is the only Australian adventurer to have escaped.

References 

2009 British television seasons